František Chvostek (May 21, 1835 – November 16, 1884) was a Czech-Austrian military physician. He is most notable for having described Chvostek's sign which he described in 1876.

Chvostek was born in Frýdek-Místek, Moravia. He studied at the medical-surgical Josephs-Akademie where he received his doctorate in 1861. He served the Garnisonsspital Nr. 1 in Vienna until 1863. From 1863 to 1867 he was the assistant of Adalbert Duchek (1824–1882) and from 1868 to 1871 he lectured on electrotherapy at the Josephs-Akademie, an academy for military physicians.

In 1871 Chvostek took over Duchek's medical clinic and headed this until the academy was closed in 1874. From then on he worked as chief of the internal department of the Garnisonsspital Nr. 1 and Korrepetitor at the military courses, until his death in Vienna in 1884 as Oberstabsarzt and professor.

References

External links 
 http://www.whonamedit.com/doctor.cfm/2586.html

Czech military doctors
Austrian military doctors
People from Austrian Silesia
Austrian people of Czech descent
1835 births
1884 deaths